See Federal Street Theatre for an earlier theatre known also as the Boston Theatre
The Boston Theatre was a theatre in Boston, Massachusetts. It was first built in 1854 and operated as a theatre until 1925. Productions included performances by Thurlow Bergen, Charles A. Bigelow, Edwin Booth, Anna Held, James O'Neill Jennie Kimball, and others.

Images

References

Further reading

External links

 Harvard Theatre Collection, Houghton Library, Harvard College Library. Boston Theatre (Washington Street, Boston, Mass.):  Box office receipts: Guide; and  Orchestra music: Guide.

Former theatres in Boston
19th century in Boston
1854 establishments in Massachusetts
1925 disestablishments in Massachusetts
Cultural history of Boston
Boston Theater District
Theatres completed in 1854